The men's pommel horse was one of eight gymnastics events on the Gymnastics at the 1896 Summer Olympics programme. The pommel horse was the fourth event held on 9 April. 15 athletes from five nations started the pommel horse exercise. Zutter won Switzerland's first gold medal in this event, with Weingärtner taking the silver.

Background

This was the first appearance of the event, which is one of the five apparatus events held every time there were apparatus events at the Summer Olympics (no apparatus events were held in 1900, 1908, 1912, or 1920). The field consisted of 10 Germans plus five men from four other nations.

Competition format

Judges awarded the prizes, but little is known of the scoring and rankings.

Schedule

The men's pommel horse was held in the afternoon of the fourth day of events, following the 800 metres, team parallel bars, team horizontal bar, and men's vault.

Results

References

Sources
  (Digitally available at )
  (Excerpt available at )
 

Men's pommel horse
Men's 1896